Such Is Life is a 2000 Mexican drama film directed by Arturo Ripstein. An updated version of Seneca's play Medea, it was screened in the Un Certain Regard section at the 2000 Cannes Film Festival.

Cast
 Arcelia Ramírez - Julia
 Patricia Reyes Spíndola - Adela, The Godmother
 Luis Felipe Tovar - Nicolás
 Ernesto Yáñez - La Marrana
 Alejandra Montoya - Teenager
 Marta Aura - (as Martha Aura)
 Daniela Carvajal
 Constanza Cavalli
 Beto Alonso Gil
 Francesca Guillén - Raquel
 Osami Kawano
 Loló Navarro
 Andrés Weiss
 Marco Zapata

References

External links

2000 films
2000 drama films
2000s Spanish-language films
Films based on Medea (Euripides play)
Films directed by Arturo Ripstein
Films scored by David Mansfield
Mexican drama films
2000s Mexican films